The Dragon's Apprentice written by James A. Owen is the fifth book in the Chronicles of the Imaginarium Geographica. It is preceded by The Shadow Dragons. It has been stated by the author that at least two novels will follow, the first of them entitled The Dragons of Winter, and the next entitled The First Dragon, along with what Owen refers to as "surprises". One of these "surprises" is Owen's book Drawing Out the Dragons, a collection of stories from Owen's life and instructions on how to draw the art featured in the main series.

Synopsis
The novel opens in 1943, seven years after the previous book The Shadow Dragons and in the midst of World War II. The Caretakers learn that the Keep of Time has finally disintegrated, causing time to collapse; whereafter Rose Dyson, their ward, is instructed to find Samaranth's apprentice, ask the dragon a riddle, and save the Archipelago of Dreams from the Echthroi. The Caretakers are trapped in the Archipelago by the destruction of the Keep of Time; and when John, Jack, and Charles return to the Summer Country (congruent to the historical world) in 1943, their refuge Tamerlane House, with all of its inhabitants, is transported to 1945 and attached to Oxford. The Caretakers Emeritis learn from John and Jack that Charles died two weeks earlier.

John, Jack, Fred the badger, the Tin Man (Roger Bacon), Laura Glue, Richard Burton, Harry Houdini, Arthur Conan Doyle, and the mysterious End of Time, a friend of Burton's, travel to Avalon and the Archipelago but discover it in ruins and learn that two thousand years have passed in the Archipelago since their last visit. At the capital Paralon, they meet a boy named Coal, the last of Arthur's descendants, whom the animals are protecting. From Aven, the daughter of H.G. Wells, they learn of what has happened over the last two thousand years. As the dark star 'Rao' approaches, they go through a door from the Keep of Time (given, in the previous book, to ex-antagonist Madoc) and appear in Dickensian London. There, a young man named Edmund McGee leads them to his master, Benjamin Franklin.

By persuading Mordred/Madoc to become a dragon himself, and by using Edmund McGee's prodigious skill in cartography and chronology to navigate time, the Caretakers begin restoration of the Keep.

References 

The Chronicles of the Imaginarium Geographica
2010 American novels
Modern Arthurian fiction
American fantasy novels
Fiction set in 1943
Fiction set in 1945
Simon & Schuster books